The Upper Passaic River in New Jersey is the section of the Passaic River above the Dundee Dam, including the Great Falls. The entire river flows for 81 miles from its river's source in Mendham to the river mouth at Newark Bay in the northeastern part of the state. The Passaic traverses 45 municipalities, and its watershed provides drinking water for more than 3.5 million people in the region. The midpoint of the upper river generally delineates the Passaic-Bergen, Passaic-Essex, Essex-Morris, Morris-Union and sections of the Morris-Somerset county lines.

There are over 110 crossings along the lower and upper river including vehicular and rail bridges. The upper reaches are also crossed by footbridges, dams, culverts, and a pre-colonial weir. In the colonial era the first bridge along the lower reaches was at Bridge Street in Newark and the first over the upper river was Totowa Bridge, constructed before 1737. The creation of Society for Establishing Useful Manufactures in 1791 began a period of development of cities and industries along the river. The emergence of the early railroads in the state led to further industrialization and urbanization and many rail bridges. The flood of 1903 caused damage or destruction of most bridges in the vicinity of Paterson. The advent of the automobile age and suburbanization in the early and mid-20th century saw the construction of highway bridges in northern New Jersey.

Existing crossings of the Lower Passaic are PD Draw, Lincoln Highway Passaic River Bridge, Pulaski Skyway, Point-No-Point Bridge, Chaplain Washington Bridge, Harry Laderman Bridge, Jackson Street Bridge, Dock Bridge, Bridge Street Bridge, Newark Drawbridge, William A. Stickel Memorial Bridge, Clay Street Bridge, NX Bridge, WR Draw, Belleville Turnpike Bridge, Avondale Bridge, Lyndhurst Draw, Route 3 Passaic River Crossing, Union Avenue Bridge, Gregory Avenue Bridge, Market Street Bridge, Eighth Street Bridge, Passaic Street Bridge, Monroe Street Bridge and Veterans Bridge.

Power transmission lines pass over the river several times. The Public Service Electric and Gas Company (PSE&G) Northern Inner Ring Transmission Line runs from Metuchen Substation to Athenia Substation in Clifton via Roseland Substation and also includes right of way from Roseland Substation to West Orange Substation. The Pennsylvania-New Jersey Interconnection (PJM Interconnection) Bushkill to Roseland Transmission Line extends from Roseland to Hardwick Township in Warren County. Jersey Central Power and Light also has lines across the river.

Crossings

Abbreviations and definitions

CR=County Route
DL&W=Delaware, Lackawanna and Western Railroad
Dual bridges=two separate parallel structures on same highway
Erie=Erie Railroad
EB=Eastbound
EL=Erie Lackawanna Railway
FRA=Federal Railroad Administration
ME=Morristown and Erie Railway
MP=Milepoint, milepost, (mile marker) distance from point of origin of train line, beginning of highway, or distance from river mouth
NB=Northbound
NBI=National Bridge Inventory
NRHP=National Register of Historic Places
NJDOT=New Jersey Department of Transportation
NJM=New Jersey Midland Railway
NJRHP=New Jersey Register of Historic Places
NJT=New Jersey Transit Rail Operations
NJTPA=North Jersey Transportation Planning Authority
NJTA=New Jersey Turnpike Authority
NYS&W=New York, Susquehanna and Western Railway
NS=Norfolk Southern Railway
PVWC=Passaic Valley Water Commission
SB=Southbound
SHPO=State Historic Preservation Office
WB=Westbound

See also

 List of dams and reservoirs in New Jersey
 Passaic River Flood Tunnel
 List of crossings of the Hackensack River
 List of bridges, tunnels, and cuts in Hudson County
List of bridges documented by the Historic American Engineering Record in New Jersey
 List of county routes in Bergen County, New Jersey
 List of county routes in Passaic County, New Jersey
 List of county routes in Morris County, New Jersey
 Passaic River Coalition

Sources 

Title 33 of the Code of Federal RegulationsNavigation and Navigable Waters PART 117—DRAWBRIDGE OPERATION REGULATIONS Subpart B—Specific Requirements, New Jersey

References 

Bridges in New Jersey

Bridges in Morris County, New Jersey
Transportation in Bergen County, New Jersey
Transportation in Essex County, New Jersey
Transportation in Passaic County, New Jersey
Transportation in Somerset County, New Jersey
Transportation in Union County, New Jersey
Buildings and structures in Essex County, New Jersey
Buildings and structures in Somerset County, New Jersey
Buildings and structures in Union County, New Jersey
Bridges in Passaic County, New Jersey
Bridges in Bergen County, New Jersey
Passaic River